Step Back may refer to:

Step-back or setback, in architecture, a step-like recession in a wall
Step Back (album) by Johnny Winter, 2014
"Step Back" (song), by Ronnie McDowell, 1982
"Step Back"/"Slide", a single by Superheist, 2001
"Step Back", a song by Candlebox from Happy Pills, 1998
"Step Back" (Got the Beat song), 2022
Step-back jump shot, a basketball move